The black-footed gray langur (Semnopithecus hypoleucos) is an Old World monkey, one of the species of langurs. Found in southern India, this, like other gray langurs, is a leaf-eating monkey.

Taxonomy
The black-footed gray langur was previously considered to be a subspecies of Semnopithecus entellus. Research done in 2003 by Brandon-Jones may indicate that it is a subspecies of Semnopithecus dussumieri. Some experts believe that the species may be a naturally occurring hybrid of Semnopithecus johnii and Semnopithecus dussumieri.  Currently S. dussumieri is considered a junior synonym of the black-footed gray langur.

Distribution
This black-footed gray langur is distributed throughout south-western India (Goa, Karnataka and Kerala), but is centred on the Western Ghats. Its total range is around 35,000 km2, with the species living inside and outside of protected areas.

References

black-footed gray langur
Endemic fauna of India
Mammals of India
Monkeys in India
black-footed gray langur
black-footed gray langur